Petri is a surname.
Petri may also refer to:

 Petri (given name), a given name
 Petri dish, a glass or dish used in cell cultures
 Petri disease or young vine decline, a plant disease
 Petri net, a mathematical representation of discrete distributed systems
 Petri Camera Co. Ltd., manufacturer of cameras and lenses